Elsie Whitaker Martinez (1 March 1890 – 31 January 1984) was renowned for her beauty in youth and old age, a muse of many famed writers and artists and an associate of most people in Northern California's Bohemian community of 1906 into the 1920s. Piedmont Bohemian George Sterling called her "the Blessed Damozel."

Early life

Elsie Whitaker was born on March 1, 1890, in Manitoba, Canada, daughter of novelist and war correspondent Herman Whitaker and Margaret A Vandecar (1868-1905).

In 1902, she and her family moved to the hills of Piedmont, California, to the "Silk Culture House" at the end of Mountain Avenue. She went to Piedmont grammar school and spent two years Oakland High School. She loved books and studied European history, drama, and literature. By age 16, Whitaker was a "free-spirited artist."

Elsie met painter Xavier Martinez (1869–1943) at Coppa's Restaurant in San Francisco. Finding her a perfect subject, he sketched her and began his Elsie series. After the earthquake of 1906, Martinez moved to Piedmont. Months later, he proposed to an 18-year-old Whitaker, who had already promised to marry at least four other men, who were friends of her father. Choosing Martinez, she said, "I decided to pick the one who would give me the most interesting life." Martinez, at 37, was only two years younger than Elsie's father Herman Whitaker. The couple married on October 17, 1907, in San Francisco. She spent summers with  Xavier while he taught classes between 1913 and 1940.

Xavier and Elise had a daughter on August 13, 1913, Micaela "Kai" Martinez (1913–1989) became a fine artist. Micaela studied with Victor Arnautoff and sculpture with Ralph Stackpole; she later studied stone cutting with Ruth Cravath. In 1944 she married artist Ralph DuCasse and changed her name to Micaela Martinez DuCasse.

Later life

In 1908, Elise and Xavier stayed with Perry Newberry in Carmel-by-the-Sea, California, when Xavier taught classes in the California School of Arts and crafts. She was active in work on the restoration of the Carmel Mission.

In 1923, Elsie and Xavier Martínez separated and she moved into Harriet Dean's house, who she met at the Little Review which was published in San Francisco. Harriet, Kai, and Elsie went to Europe in 1922 and they spent a year in France. In 1939, Elise, Harriet, and Kai moved to Carmel. In 1941, Xavier became ill, so they took him to Carmel. He was with them for seven months before he died on January 13, 1943.

In 1962 and 1963, Elsie was interviewed extensively for the Regional Oral History Office as a part of a series on San Francisco Bay Area artistic and cultural history. The interview was undertaken at the request of James D. Hart, Professor of English, who served as faculty advisor. She moved to San Francisco in 1981, after living for many years in Carmel. One of the interviewrs, Franklin D. Walker, interviewed Elise at her house in Carmel on the corner of 17th Avenue and El Carmelo Street. In this interview she shared her memories, papers, and scrapbooks.

In 1981, Elsie moved to San Francisco.

Death

Elsie died on January 31, 1984, at St. Anne's Home in San Francisco following a brief illness. She was 93. She is buried at San Carlos Cemetery in Monterey, California.

Gallery

See also
 History of Piedmont, California

References

External links

Piedmont Historical Photo Archive
  Elsie Whitaker Martinez papers, circa 1910-1953

1890 births
1984 deaths
History of the San Francisco Bay Area
People from Carmel-by-the-Sea, California
Artists from Manitoba
People from Piedmont, California